|}

This is a list of House of Assembly results for the 1997 South Australian state election.

Results by electoral district

Adelaide

Bragg

Bright

Chaffey

Coles

Colton

Davenport

Elder

Elizabeth

Finniss

Fisher

Flinders

Florey

Frome

Giles

Gordon

Goyder

Hammond

Hanson

Hart

Hartley

Heysen

Kaurna

Kavel

Lee

Light

MacKillop

Mawson

Mitchell

Morphett

Napier

Newland

Norwood

Peake

Playford

Price

Ramsay

Reynell

Ross Smith

Schubert

Spence

Stuart

Taylor

Torrens

Unley

Waite

Wright

See also
 Candidates of the 1997 South Australian state election
 Members of the South Australian House of Assembly, 1997–2002

References

SA elections archive: Antony Green ABC
2002 SA election: Antony Green ABC

1997
1997 elections in Australia
1990s in South Australia